Adams Island was an island in the U.S. state of Massachusetts.

History 

Adams Island was originally part of Tuckernuck Island. During the 1890s, the westernmost part of Tuckernuck extended almost to Muskeget Island and served as a barrier beach, protecting the Gravel Islands, western Dry Shoal, and Little Gull Island.

The island came into existence in 1902, when the Haulover Nor'easter severed it from Tuckernuck. Another island, Tombolo, was also created. In 1907, Adams almost attached itself to Muskeget, but failed to do so because the sea formed a narrow deep channel separating Adams from Muskeget.

In 1910, Adams' length was shortened due to a tropical storm and an autumn nor'easter. By 1920, Adams was less than four hundred meters long. A little less than ten meters of it remained in 1950, and by 1980 it was gone.

Adams Island Day 

In 1983, a group of Nantucket residents, self-designated as Adamites, held a small celebration in honor of the former island.  The first Adams Island Celebration was characterized by a nihilist/absurdist spirit emphasizing the short existence of the island and downplaying its disappearance.  The celebration has taken place in some form each year since 1983, and although it rarely falls on the same day as in the previous year, it is known each year to Adamites as Adams Island Day.

By boat, one can easily access Tuckernuck from Madaket on the island of Nantucket.

Coastal islands of Massachusetts
Islands of Nantucket, Massachusetts
Former islands of the United States